The  is a gas field located in the southwest of Nagaoka, Niigata Prefecture, Japan. It was discovered in 1979 and is developed by INPEX Corporation. One of the largest in Japan, the field has been in production since 1984, with the completion of the Koshijihara Gas Plant. Even after more than 25 years of continuous output, Minami-Nagaoka still accounts for approximately 40% of Japan's total natural gas production.

References

Natural gas fields in Japan
Geography of Niigata Prefecture
Nagaoka, Niigata